Anatoly Raznochintsev (22 November 1927 – 19 July 1994) was a Soviet swimmer. He competed in the men's 400 metre freestyle at the 1952 Summer Olympics.

References

External links
 

1927 births
1994 deaths
Soviet male freestyle swimmers
Olympic swimmers of the Soviet Union
Swimmers at the 1952 Summer Olympics
People from Armavir, Russia
Sportspeople from Krasnodar Krai